Darryl Sharpton (born January 1, 1988) is a former American football linebacker. He was drafted by the Houston Texans in the fourth round of the 2010 NFL Draft. He played college football at the University of Miami.

Early years
Sharpton attended Coral Gables Senior High School in Coral Gables, Florida. As a senior, he recorded 96 tackles, two interceptions, and blocked four punts. As a junior, he had 110 tackles and returned an interception for a touchdown.

College career
After being redshirted as a freshman in 2005, Sharpton earned third-team freshman All-America by The Sporting News and Collegefootballnews.com and was selected to The Sporting News ACC all-freshman team. He finished the season starting five of 12 games recording 41 tackles and a sack. As a sophomore in 2007 he started five of 11 games, recording 57 tackles. As a junior in 2008 recorded 58 tackles and a sack. As a senior in 2009 he had 106 tackles including 8.5 TFL and returned an interception for a touchdown. He also had a forced fumble.

Professional career

Houston Texans
Sharpton was drafted by the Houston Texans in the fourth round (102nd pick) of the 2010 NFL Draft.

Washington Redskins
Sharpton signed a one-year contract with the Washington Redskins on March 13, 2014. The Redskins placed him on injured reserve on August 30, 2014. The Redskins terminated Sharpton's contract on September 22.

Chicago Bears
He signed with the Chicago Bears on September 24, 2014.

Arizona Cardinals
Sharpton signed with the Arizona Cardinals in May 2015. On August 19, he was released by the Cardinals.

Personal life
Sharpton is the second cousin of famous minister Al Sharpton, though by his own admission, he thinks of him more as an uncle.

References

External links
Washington Redskins bio
Houston Texans bio
Miami Hurricanes bio

1988 births
Living people
American football linebackers
Arizona Cardinals players
Chicago Bears players
Houston Texans players
Miami Hurricanes football players
Players of American football from Florida
Sportspeople from Coral Gables, Florida
Washington Redskins players